NKS may refer to:

 NKS is the ICAO code for the American air carrier Spirit Airlines
 NKS, Norske Kvinners Sanitetsforening, a Norwegian humanitarian organisation
 NKS Nysa, a Polish volleyball team
 A New Kind of Science, a 2002 book by Stephen Wolfram
 Native Kontrol Standard, an audio plug-in extension which allows integration with Native Instruments hardware